Michael or Mike Connors may refer to:

Actors
Mike Connors (vaudevillian) (1891–1949), American-Australian radio presenter
Mike Connors (1925–2017), American actor
Michael Connors, American actor in 1996 horror film Pinocchio's Revenge

Others
Michael Connors (filmmaker) from List of American films of 2012
Michael Connors (mayor) on List of mayors of Holyoke, Massachusetts

See also
Michael Connor (disambiguation)